A Hard Day's Night is the third studio album by the English rock band the Beatles, released on 10 July 1964 by Parlophone, with side one containing songs from the soundtrack to their film of the same name. The American version of the album was released two weeks earlier, on 26 June 1964 by United Artists Records, with a different track listing that included selections from George Martin's film score. In contrast to the Beatles' first two albums, all 13 tracks on A Hard Day's Night were written by John Lennon and Paul McCartney, showcasing the development of their songwriting partnership.

The album includes the song "A Hard Day's Night", with its distinctive opening chord, and "Can't Buy Me Love", both transatlantic number-one singles for the band. Several of the songs feature George Harrison playing a Rickenbacker 12-string electric guitar, a sound that was influential on the Byrds and other groups in the folk rock/jangle pop movement.

Recording

Shortly after the release of With the Beatles (1963), the Beatles were at EMI Pathé Marconi Studios in Paris on 29 January 1964 for their first recording session outside of London. Here, they recorded German-language versions of their two most recent singles, "I Want to Hold Your Hand" and "She Loves You", titled "Komm, gib mir deine Hand" and "Sie liebt dich", respectively. According to their producer, George Martin, this was done as "they couldn't sell large quantities of records [in Germany] unless they were sung in German". Also recorded—in English—was Paul McCartney's "Can't Buy Me Love", which was completed in only four takes. Shortly afterward, the band gave their first live performance in the United States on The Ed Sullivan Show on 9 February. They gave more US performances before returning to the United Kingdom on 22 February.

The Beatles were set to begin filming their first major feature film on 2 March 1964. According to historian Mark Lewisohn, the band were set to record songs for both the film and a tie-in LP, of which the songs from the film were completed first. On 25 February—lead guitarist George Harrison's 21st birthday—the band were back at London's EMI Studios, recording John Lennon's "You Can't Do That" for release as the B-side of "Can't Buy Me Love". The band also attempted "And I Love Her" and "I Should Have Known Better" on this day and again the following day, with the former finalised on 27 February. Two more songs from the film, "Tell Me Why" and "If I Fell", were recorded on this day.

On 1 March 1964, the Beatles recorded three songs in three hours: "I'm Happy Just to Dance with You" for the film, featuring Harrison on lead vocal; a cover of Little Richard's "Long Tall Sally"; and Lennon's "I Call Your Name", which was originally given to Billy J. Kramer and the Dakotas the previous year. Mono and stereo mixing was carried out over the following two weeks. The "Can't Buy Me Love" / "You Can't Do That" single was released on 16 March and topped charts worldwide. Taking a break for filming, drummer Ringo Starr coined the phrase "a hard day's night", providing the film with its title. Lennon and McCartney wrote a song based on the title, which was recorded at EMI on 16 April and mixed four days later.

On 1 June, with the film completed and the band returning from holidays, the Beatles returned to EMI, recording the remaining songs for the tie-in LP, with outtakes appearing on the Long Tall Sally EP. Covers of Carl Perkins' "Matchbox", with Starr on lead vocals, and Larry Williams' "Slow Down", appeared on the EP, while Lennon's "I'll Cry Instead" and "I'll Be Back" appeared on the LP. The following day on 2 June, the band completed Lennon's "Any Time at All" and "When I Get Home", and McCartney's "Things We Said Today". The band spent the remainder of June and July touring internationally.

Content
Musically, A Hard Day's Night eschews the rock and roll cover songs of the band's previous albums for a predominantly pop sound. Sputnikmusic's Dave Donnelly observes "short, peppy" pop songs characterised by layered vocals, immediate choruses, and understated instrumentation. According to Pitchfork Tom Ewing, the lack of rock and roll covers allows listeners to "take the group's new sound purely on its own modernist terms", with audacious "chord choices", powerful harmonies, "gleaming" guitar, and "Northern" harmonica. Music journalist Robert Christgau writes that Lennon–McCartney's songs were "more sophisticated musically" than before. It also features Harrison playing a Rickenbacker 12-string electric guitar, a sound that was influential on the Byrds and other bands in the folk rock explosion of 1965.

Side one of the LP contains the songs from the film soundtrack. Side two contains songs written for, but not included in, the film, although a 1980s re-release of the film includes a prologue before the opening credits with "I'll Cry Instead" on the soundtrack. The title of the album and film was the accidental creation of Starr. According to Lennon in a 1980 interview with Playboy magazine: "I was going home in the car and [film director] Dick Lester suggested the title, 'Hard Day's Night' from something Ringo had said. I had used it in In His Own Write, but it was an off-the-cuff remark by Ringo. You know, one of those malapropisms. A Ringo-ism, where he said it not to be funny ... just said it. So Dick Lester said, 'We are going to use that title.'"

A Hard Day's Night is the first Beatles album to feature entirely original compositions, and the only one where all the songs were written by Lennon–McCartney. Lennon is the primary author of nine of the thirteen tracks on the album, as well as being the lead singer on these same nine tracks (although Paul McCartney sings lead on the title track's middle-eight). Lennon and McCartney co-wrote "I'm Happy Just to Dance with You", sung by Harrison, while McCartney wrote "And I Love Her", "Can't Buy Me Love" and "Things We Said Today". It is one of three Beatles albums, along with Let It Be and Magical Mystery Tour, in which Starr does not sing lead vocal on any songs. (Starr sang the lead vocal on "Matchbox" during the sessions; it appeared instead on the Long Tall Sally EP.) It is also one of three Beatles albums, along with Please Please Me and Beatles for Sale, in which Harrison does not contribute to the songwriting.

Critical reception and legacy

According to music critic Richie Unterberger, writing for AllMusic:
George Harrison's resonant 12-string electric guitar leads [on A Hard's Day's Night] were hugely influential; the movie helped persuade the Byrds, then folksingers, to plunge all out into rock & roll, and the Beatles would be hugely influential on the folk-rock explosion of 1965. The Beatles' success, too, had begun to open the US market for fellow English bands like the Rolling Stones, the Animals, and the Kinks, and inspired young American groups like the Beau Brummels, Lovin' Spoonful, and others to mount a challenge of their own with self-penned material that owed a great debt to Lennon–McCartney.

In his book Yeah! Yeah! Yeah!: The Story of Pop Music from Bill Haley to Beyoncé, Bob Stanley identifies A Hard Day's Night as the album that best captures the band's early-career appeal. He writes:
If you had to explain the Beatles' impact to a stranger, you'd play them the soundtrack to A Hard Day's Night. The songs, conceived in a hotel room in a spare couple of weeks between up-ending the British class system and conquering America, were full of bite and speed. There was adventure, knowingness, love, and abundant charm.

A Hard Day's Night was included in the list of "100 Essential Rock Albums" compiled by musicologists Charlie Gillett and Simon Frith for ZigZag magazine in 1975, and is one of the "Treasure Island albums" featured in Greil Marcus's 1979 book Stranded. In 2000, Q magazine placed A Hard Day's Night at number 5 on its list "The 100 Greatest British Albums Ever". That same year, it appeared at number 22 in Colin Larkin's book All Time Top 1000 Albums. In 2012, Rolling Stone ranked it 307th on the magazine's list of the 500 Greatest Albums of All Time. In the 2020 revision, it rose to number 263.

A Hard Day's Night has also appeared in critics' lists of the best albums of all time published by the NME, in 1974 (at number 33), 1985 (number 73) and 2013 (number 195); Mojo, in 1995 (number 81); and Uncut, in 2016 (number 149). It was a featured album in The Mojo Collection: The Greatest Albums of All Time, Tom Moon's book 1,000 Recordings to Hear Before You Die and Robert Dimery's 1001 Albums You Must Hear Before You Die, and was selected as one of the "Most Significant Rock Albums" in the Greenwood Encyclopedia of Rock History. Based on the album's appearances in professional rankings and listings, the aggregate website Acclaimed Music lists A Hard Day's Night as the most acclaimed album of 1964, the 45th most acclaimed album of the 1960s and the 222nd most acclaimed album in history.

Reissues
On 26 February 1987, A Hard Day's Night was officially released on compact disc in mono, along with Please Please Me, With the Beatles, and Beatles for Sale. Having been available only as an import in the US in the past, the 13 track UK version of the album was also issued in the US on LP and cassette on 21 July 1987. Stereo mixes of "A Hard Day's Night", "Can't Buy Me Love", and "And I Love Her" had been made available on the first compact disc issue of 1962–1966 in 1993. Most of the rest of the tracks appeared in stereo on compact disc for the first time with the release of the box set The Capitol Albums, Volume 1 in 2004.

On 9 September 2009, a remastered version of this album was released and was the first time the album appeared in stereo on compact disc in its entirety. This album is also included in The Beatles Stereo Box Set. A remastered mono version of the original UK album was part of The Beatles in Mono box set.

Track listing

North American release

The American version of the album was released on 26 June 1964 by United Artists Records in both mono and stereo, the fourth Beatles album in the United States. The album went to number one on the Billboard album chart, spending 14 weeks there, the longest run of any album that year. United Artists rushed the album into stores over a month before the film's US premiere; as a result, the Beatles had both the number-one album and number-one single in the country when A Hard Day's Night opened on 11 August 1964.

All seven songs from the film, the first side of the UK album, were featured along with "I'll Cry Instead", which, although written for the film, was cut at the last minute. The American version also included four orchestral instrumental versions of Lennon and McCartney songs arranged by George Martin conducting an orchestra of studio musicians: "I Should Have Known Better", "And I Love Her", "Ringo's Theme", and "A Hard Day's Night". After EMI acquired United Artists Records, this album was reissued in August 1980 on the Capitol label, catalogue SW-11921.

While the stereo version of the album included the instrumental tracks in true stereo, the Beatles' own recordings appeared as electronically rechannelled stereo recordings made from the mono releases. The 1980 Capitol Records reissue used the same master tape as the original United Artists LP release in fake stereo, despite the availability of several tracks with official true stereo remixes. True stereo versions of most of the songs had been issued on the Capitol album Something New, released in July 1964. "Can't Buy Me Love" and "I Should Have Known Better" finally appeared in stereo on the 1970 Apple Records compilation Hey Jude. The song "A Hard Day's Night" did not appear in true stereo in the US until the 1982 Capitol compilation album Reel Music. In 2014, the American version of the "A Hard Day's Night" album was released on CD individually and in a boxed set of all the other US Beatles albums to celebrate the fiftieth anniversary of the Beatles first US visit. This CD reissue features all of the songs in both true stereo and mono mixes.

Track listing

Charts and certifications

Chart performance

Certifications
Original release

North American release

Personnel
Sources:
The Beatles
 John Lennon – vocals; acoustic, rhythm and lead guitars; piano; harmonica
 Paul McCartney – vocals; bass guitar; piano; cowbell
 George Harrison – vocals; lead (six- and twelve-string) and acoustic guitars
 Ringo Starr – drums, percussion

Additional personnel
 George Martin – piano, production, orchestrations of instrumentals for film and American LP

References

Sources

External links

 Beatles comments on each song
 Recording data and notes on mono/stereo mixes and remixes

1964 albums
1964 soundtrack albums
Albums produced by George Martin
Albums with cover art by Robert Freeman (photographer)
Musical film soundtracks
George Martin albums
Grammy Hall of Fame Award recipients
Parlophone albums
Parlophone soundtracks
The Beatles albums
The Beatles soundtracks
United Artists Records soundtracks
Comedy film soundtracks